Guanyin Township is a township of Gongcheng Yao Autonomous County in northeastern Guangxi, China. , it has four villages under its administration:
Guanyin Village
Yangshi Village
Shitang Village
Shuibin Village

See also
List of township-level divisions of Guangxi

References

Townships of Guilin
Gongcheng Yao Autonomous County